Toulouse is the debut EP released by New Zealand singer-songwriter Benny Tipene in 2014. It was produced by Sam de Jong and released by Sony Music Entertainment New Zealand. Tipene's debut single "Walking on Water" is included on digital copies as a bonus track.

Critical reception
Calling it a "little love letter of an EP," Kate Taylor of muzic.net.nz said the EP "smacks of the delay being due to his perfectionism and care to produce a solid, lasting debut effort."

Track listing

Personnel 

 Benny Tipene - guitars, vocals, bass
 Sam de Jong - drums, keys, programming, bass
 Holly Pearson, Luke Oram, Laura Hunter - backing vocals on "Make You Mine"
Produced and Engineered by Sam de Jong
Recorded at Parachute Studios
Mixed by Nic Manders at Wairiki Rd
Mastered by Leon Zervos at Studios 301, Sydney
 "Make You Mine" mastered by Chris Chetland at Kog Mastering Ltd, Auckland
Cover artwork by Hikalu Clarke

Charts

References

2014 EPs
Benny Tipene albums
Albums produced by Sam de Jong